= Inspector Carr Investigates =

South African detective radio series

- Genre: Crime
- Starring: Hugh Rouse, Don Davis
- Written by: Michael Silver
- Produced by: Michael Silver

Inspector Carr Investigates, originally titled The Epic Casebook of Inspector Carr, was a South African detective radio series broadcast on Springbok Radio from 1957 to June 1985. It was written and produced by Michael Silver at the CRC Studios, Johannesburg.

== Content ==
Inspector Carr Investigates was a weekly radio series produced at CRC Studios in Johannesburg and broadcast on Springbok Radio from the late 1957 through 1985. Don Davis was the first actor to play as Inspector Carr. Around 1959, his role was given to Hugh Rouse. Unfortunately, the attempt to adapt the radio series into television format ended in failure.

== Episodes ==
The episodes include notable examples include:

1. Epic Casebook Inspector Carr 850627 - Murder Anonymous (Last Episode)
2. Epic Casebook Inspector Carr 791227 - Concrete Evidence
3. Epic Casebook Inspector Carr 700801 - No Holds Barred
4. Epic Casebook Inspector Carr 700319 - Waters of Death
5. Epic Casebook Inspector Carr 691211 - Death in the Counterfoil
6. Epic Casebook Carr 691204 - Death is the Victor
7. Epic Casebook Inspector Carr 691109 - AntiThesis of Life
8. Epic Casebook Inspector Carr 691002 - Murder in the Bag
9. Epic Casebook Inspector Carr 680613 - Threads of Death
10. Epic Casebook Inspector Carr 680404 - Death Among the Sleepers
11. Epic Casebook Inspector Carr 1957-1977 - Warning Anonymous
12. Epic Casebook Inspector Carr 1957-1977 - Too Close A Shave
13. Epic Casebook Inspector Carr 1957-1977 - The Traffic Of Death
14. Epic Casebook Inspector Carr 1957-1977 - The Conjurer's Illusion
15. Epic Casebook Inspector Carr 1957-1977 - Switch On For Death
16. Epic Casebook Inspector Carr 1957-1977 - Rapture of Death
17. Epic Casebook Inspector Carr 1957-1977 - Murder on the Brain
18. Epic Casebook Inspector Carr 1957-1977 - Grand Prix is Death
19. Epic Casebook Inspector Carr 1957-1977 - Gates to Death
20. Epic Casebook Inspector Carr 1957-1977 - Final Chapter
21. Epic Casebook Inspector Carr 1957-1977 - Death Is No Accident
22. Epic Casebook Inspector Carr 1957-1977 - Death in the Wife's Name
23. Epic Casebook Inspector Carr 1957-1977 - Dead Lie
24. Epic Casebook Inspector Carr 1957-1977 - Clue that Never Was
25. Epic Casebook Inspector Carr 1957-1977 - An Author's Ending
26. Epic Casebook Inspector Carr - Crossed Are The Telephone Lines
